Max Croker (born 13 May 1998 in Australia) is an Australian motorcycle racer. He currently competes in the Australian Supersport Championship, aboard a Suzuki GSX-R600.

Grand Prix motorcycle racing

By season

Races by year

External links

1998 births
Living people
Australian motorcycle racers
Moto2 World Championship riders